The International Journal of Public Health, formerly known as Sozial- und Präventivmedizin (1955-2007) is the peer reviewed academic journal of the Swiss School of Public Health.

In 2021, Springer announced the move of this journal to a new publisher, Frontiers.

References 

Springer Science+Business Media academic journals
Public health journals
Publications established in 1955